Gurudwara Guru Nanak Dham is a gurudwara situated in the town of Rameswaram in Tamil Nadu, India. The gurudwara was constructed to commemorate the visit of the first Sikh guru, Guru Nanak to Rameswaram in about 1511. The gurudwarar was visited by the Governor of Tamil Nadu, Surjit Singh Barnala in 2005. Barnala assured the priests of help in repairing and enlarging the gurudwara.

Notes 

Gurdwaras in Tamil Nadu
Ramanathapuram district
Rameswaram